Jochen Molling (born 9 August 1973) is a German ice hockey player. He competed in the men's tournament at the 1998 Winter Olympics.

Career statistics

Regular season and playoffs

International

References

1973 births
Living people
Ice hockey people from Berlin
Olympic ice hockey players of Germany
Ice hockey players at the 1998 Winter Olympics
Adler Mannheim players
Augsburger Panther players
Berlin Capitals players
BSC Preussen Berlin players
EHC Freiburg players
Hamburg Freezers players
Kassel Huskies players
Lausitzer Füchse players
SC Bietigheim-Bissingen players
Schwenninger Wild Wings players